Bukit Tinggi is a small town in Bentong District, Pahang, Malaysia. This small town is located along Kuala Lumpur–Karak Expressway, notable for its famous restaurants that lure visitors coming from Genting Highlands. The town features a French-themed village, Colmar Tropicale.

About
Bukit Tinggi is located 55 minutes from Kuala Lumpur (54.3 km) and lies 800 metres above sea level. The temperature of the town is between 22 and 26° Celsius.

Notable attractions
Berjaya Hills Resort
Colmar Tropicale
Bukit Tinggi Golf and Country Club
Japanese Tea House and Botanical Garden
Bukit Tinggi Rabbit Farm

References

External links 

 Pahang at Pahang Tourism

Hill stations in Malaysia
Hills of Malaysia
Towns in Pahang
Resorts in Malaysia
Tourist attractions in Pahang
Landforms of Pahang
Populated places in Pahang